Casma is a town in Peru.

Casma may also refer to:
Casma Province, province of the Ancash Region of Peru
Casma District, district of Casma Province
Casma River, river that crosses Casma Province in the Ancash Region of Peru
Casma Valley, coastal valley north of Lima, Peru
CASMA, Computerized Airline Sales and Marketing Association
Chilean ship Casma (1889)